Villa Park is a village in DuPage County, Illinois, United States, within the Chicago metropolitan area. The population as of the 2020 Census is 21,113. Villa Park is a western suburb of Chicago.

History 
 
When Ovaltine established its factory, it needed a way to make sure that its employees could get to and from work safely regardless of the weather, terrain or other issues. Villa Park was built originally for that reason, as well as for a convenient train stop.

Following the construction of a subdivision called Villa Park in 1908 and another called Ardmore in 1910 by the real estate firm Ballard & Pottinger, Villa Park was incorporated in 1914 by uniting the two subdivisions of 300 people. The first village president, William H. Calhoun, was elected on September 12, 1914. Although the merged town was originally named after the Ardmore subdivision, the community changed its name to Villa Park in 1917. Villa Park was one of a number of suburbs directly west of downtown Chicago that flourished as a result of the electric interurban line, the Chicago Aurora and Elgin Railroad. The railroad ran from the Chicago Loop, directly west to Wheaton, Illinois, where it then split into two lines, one traveling southwest to Aurora and the other northwest to Elgin. Two small commercial areas developed, one around the Villa Avenue station and the other around the Ardmore Avenue station. In 1957, the CA&E ceased to carry passengers because of a dramatic drop in ridership from the loss of a one-seat ride by the construction of the Eisenhower Expressway (I-290) and the general increase in use of personal automobiles. The right-of-way was eventually cleaned up and developed into a hiking and bicycling trail known as the Illinois Prairie Path. The Ardmore Station is now home to the Chamber of Commerce, and the Villa Avenue Station houses the Villa Park Historical Society.

Villa Park was home to the Ovaltine chocolate factory until it closed in 1988. It was listed in the National Register of Historic Places in 1986 as building #86003781. It has since been converted into loft apartments.

Many of the residents are of Eastern European heritage, including Polish, Czech, and Russian. There is also a significant Hispanic heritage.

A sizeable Muslim immigrant community began to gather in the area in the 1980s and 1990s and established the Islamic Foundation School in 1986.

In September 2017, Villa Park was ranked No. 28 in Money Magazines "Best Places to Live in America". In October 2017, the Village was named by Money Magazine as the "8th Best Place in America to Raise a Family Now". The Daily Herald and NBC Chicago also published stories on these distinctions.

In October 2015, the Villa Park Public Library evaluated the library’s future needs and proposed the most effective solutions to address issues with the Library’s 1969 building. The Library Board and Staff developed a renovation and expansion plan that resulted in a completely renovated, expanded library facility. Construction of the project occurred in multiple phases and was completed in October 2019.

Government
Villa Park has a manager-council government. The village manager is responsible for the day-to-day operations of the town. The manager position is appointed by the Village Board of Trustees. The village is governed by the Village President and six trustees, comprising the Village Board. The six trustees and the village clerk are elected on a rotating basis every two years so that not all the trustees are up for re-election at the same time. A list of elected officials currently holding office can be found on the Village's website at invillapark.com.

Advising the Village Board on various issues are numerous commissions, composed of local residents appointed to the posts.

Geography
Villa Park is located at  (41.888650, −87.977884).

Demographics
As of the 2020 census there were 22,263 people, 8,000 households, and 5,575 families residing in the village. The racial makeup of the village was 66.68% White, 4.64% African American, 0.90% Native American, 6.15% Asian, 0.01% Pacific Islander, 10.20% from other races, and 11.43% from two or more races. Hispanic or Latino of any race were 22.84% of the population.

There were 8,000 households, out of which 59.13% had children under the age of 18 living with them, 53.95% were married couples living together, 9.41% had a female householder with no husband present, and 30.31% were non-families. 24.68% of all households were made up of individuals, and 11.70% had someone living alone who was 65 years of age or older. The average household size was 3.34 and the average family size was 2.76.

The village's age distribution consisted of 23.4% under the age of 18, 9.8% from 18 to 24, 28.9% from 25 to 44, 25.4% from 45 to 64, and 12.5% who were 65 years of age or older. The median age was 37.2 years. For every 100 females, there were 99.4 males. For every 100 females age 18 and over, there were 104.3 males.

The median income for a household in the village was $79,314, and the median income for a family was $91,250. Males had a median income of $47,722 versus $35,269 for females. The per capita income for the village was $34,529. About 3.9% of families and 6.6% of the population were below the poverty line, including 7.2% of those under age 18 and 7.0% of those age 65 or over.

Economy
According to Villa Park's 2021 Comprehensive Annual Financial Report, the top employers in the city are:

Transportation

Villa Park has a commuter railroad station on Metra's Union Pacific/West Line with service west to Elburn, Illinois, and east to downtown Chicago. The Ardmore Avenue Train Station and the Villa Avenue Train Station are also nationally registered historical places. The Ardmore Avenue Train Station is currently serving as the home for the Villa Park Chamber of Commerce, while the Villa Avenue Train Station is home to the Villa Park Historical Museum. There have been several train-pedestrian deaths in Villa Park.

Both of these former train stations lie along the Illinois Prairie Path.  The Illinois Prairie Path is a regional bicycle path linking Chicago's Western Suburbs which is popular with bicyclists and pedestrians during the warmer months, and is used for cross country skiing during winter months.

Notable people 

 Nicole Abusharif, criminal convicted of the murder of her domestic partner Rebecca Klein in Villa Park
 Norma Berger, pitcher in the All-American Girls Professional Baseball League; lives in Villa Park
 Tom Cullerton, Member of the Illinois Senate (2013–present); resides in Villa Park
 Tino Insana, actor, voice actor, writer, producer; graduated Willowbrook High School, 1966
 Anita Padilla, reporter for WFLD-TV in Chicago
 Matt Roth, former NFL player
 Bobby Wawak, driver with NASCAR; born in Villa Park

References

External links
Villa Park, Illinois (IL 60181) profile: population, maps, real estate, averages, homes, statistics, relocation, travel, jobs, hospitals, schools, crime, moving, houses, news, sex offenders
District 45 Public Schools
District 48 Public Schools
District 88 Public High Schools
Village of Villa Park
Willowbrook High School
Villa Park Historical Society
Villa Park Public Library

 
Villages in Illinois
Villages in DuPage County, Illinois
Populated places established in 1914
1914 establishments in Illinois